Listed below are the UCI Women's Teams that competed in 2006 women's road cycling events organized by the International Cycling Union (UCI) including the 2006 UCI Women's Road World Cup.

Teams overview

Riders

@Work Cycling Team

Ages as of 1 January 2006.

Bianchi Aliverti Kookai

Ages as of 1 January 2006.

Buitenpoort–Flexpoint Team

  Annette Beutler (29/06/1976) Contract from 15 June
  Loes Gunnewijk (27/11/1980)   
  Tanja Hennes (30/06/1971)    
  Luise Keller (08/03/1984)   
  Vera Koedooder (31/10/1983)  
  Susanne Ljungskog (16/03/1976) 
  Mirjam Melchers (26/09/1975)   
  Amber Neben (18/02/1975)   
  Sandra Rombouts (29/09/1976)    
  Madeleine Sandig (12/08/1983)    
  Elisabeth van Rooij (25/01/1973)  
  Suzanne van Veen (03/10/1987)   
  Linda Villumsen (09/04/1985)
Source

Lotto–Belisol Ladiesteam

  Marielle Aunave 
  Claire Baxter   
  Liesbet De Vocht   
  Sofie De Vuyst
  Ludivine Henrion    
  Siobhan Horgan   
  Myriam Jacotey 
  Christa Pirard   
  Kim Schoonbaert   
  Inge Van Den Broeck   
  An Van Rie   
  Christine Verdaros   
  Grace Verbeke   
  Kathryn Watt  
Source

Nobili Rubinetterie Menikini Cogeas

Ages as of 1 January 2006.

Team T-Mobile Women

Ages as of 1 January 2006.

Source

Therme Skin Care

Ages as of 1 January 2006.

Univega Pro Cycling Team

Ages as of 1 January 2006.

Vrienden van het Platteland

Ages as of 1 January 2006.

Sources

References

2006 in women's road cycling
2006